KPTF-DT, virtual and UHF digital channel 18, is a God's Learning Channel-affiliated television station licensed to Farwell, Texas, United States. The station is owned by Prime Time Christian Broadcasting. It is carried on Suddenlink cable television systems in Clovis, New Mexico and Amarillo, Texas.

History 
The station began as a construction permit granted by the Federal Communications Commission (FCC) to Winstar Farwell, Inc., on April 8, 1998. Originally given callsign KBGD, it was to broadcast on UHF channel 18, serving Clovis and Portales, New Mexico as well as Farwell, Texas. Winstar Farwell agreed to sell the construction permit to Prime Time Christian Broadcasting on August 24, 1999 and on February 25, 2000, Prime Time Christian Broadcasting assumed control. The station changed its callsign to KPTF on June 29, 2000. It began broadcasting under Program Test Authority in April 2001, but did not receive its license until June 26, 2002.

Located in a fringe area of the Amarillo television market, KPTF has cable carriage in Amarillo, but not in all parts of the market, in spite of must-carry rules. The FCC first ruled that Comcast must carry KPTF on its Tucumcari, but before the cable system was required to carry the station, the FCC ruled that Comcast did not have to carry KPTF. The station's over-the-air signal reaches only six of the 56 communities in the Amarillo market.

Digital channel

Because it was granted an original construction permit after the FCC finalized the DTV allotment plan on April 21, 1997, the station did not receive a companion channel for a digital television station. Instead, at the end of the DTV transition for full-service stations, KPTF turned off its analog signal and turned on its digital signal (called a "flash-cut").

References

External links 
Official site

Television channels and stations established in 2001
Television stations in Texas
2001 establishments in Texas
Parmer County, Texas